Berar Sultanate, also called as Imad Shahi Sultanate was one of the Deccan sultanates, which was founded by an Indian Muslim. It was established in 1490 following the disintegration of the Bahmani Sultanate.

History

Background
The origin of the name Berar or Warhad (वऱ्हाड) as it is spelled in Marathi, is not known. The first authentic records show it to have been part of the Andhra or Satavahana empire. On the fall of the Chalukyas in the 12th century, Berar came under the sway of the Yadavas of Deogiri, and remained in their possession until the Muslim invasions at the end of the 13th century. On the establishment of the Bahmani Sultanate in the Deccan (1348), Berar was constituted one of the five provinces into which their kingdom was divided, being governed by great nobles, with a separate army. The perils of this system became apparent when the province was divided (1478 or 1479) into two separate provinces, named after their capitals Gawil and Mahur. The Bahmani dynasty was, however, already tottering to its fall.

Establishment of the Berar Sultanate
During the disintegration of Bahmani sultanate, in 1490 Fathullah Imad-ul-Mulk, governor of Gawil, who had formerly held all Berar, proclaimed his independence and founded the Imad Shahi dynasty of Berar sultanate. He proceeded to annex Mahur to his new kingdom and had its capital at Ellichpur. Imad-ul-Mulk was by birth a Kanarese Hindu, but had been captured as a boy in one of the expeditions against the Vijayanagara Empire and brought up as a Muslim. Gavilgad and Narnala were also fortified by him.

He died in 1504 and his successor, Aladdin Imad Shah resisted the aggression of Ahmadnagar with the help from Bahadur Shah, sultan of Gujarat. The next ruler, Darya tried to align with Bijapur to prevent aggression from Ahmadnagar, but was unsuccessful. In 1568, Burhan Imad Shah was deposed by his minister Tufail Khan, and assumed the kingship. This gave a pretext for the intervention of Murtaza Nizam Shah of Ahmadnagar, who invaded Berar, imprisoned and put to death Tufail Khan, his son Shams-ul-Mulk, and the former-king Burhan, and proceeded to annex Berar into his own dominions of the Ahmadnagar Sultanate.

Sultans of Berar

The Sultans of Berar belonged to the Imad Shahi Dynasty:
 Fathullah Imad-ul-Mulk: 1490 – 1504
 Aladdin Imad Shah: 1504 – 1529
 Darya Imad Shah: 1529 – 1562. He developed the city Daryapur on the banks of Chandrabhaga River which today is a municipal council under the Amravati District.
 Burhan Imad Shah: 1562 – 1568
 Tufail Khan (usurper): 1568 – 1572

See also
List of Shi'a Muslim dynasties
Berar Subah
Berar Province
Battle of Talikota

References

External links
List of Sultans of Berar

States and territories disestablished in 1572
Berar
Deccan sultanates
Imad Shahi dynasty
Shia dynasties